Mir Nawab Khan Tanoli was the ruler of The Tanawal valley and the Chief of the Hazara region from circa 1810 until he died in 1818. During his rule, he faced many attacks from the Sikh Empire and Durrani Empire, resulting in a significant loss of territory. He was 26 years old, when he was assassinated by Azim Khan on October 13, 1818 in the Stratagem of Peshawar. 

The main reason for the war is that Mir Nawab Khan who defied Durrani and other main reason was that when Azim Khan's mother was traveling to Kashmir via Tanwal, Nawab Khan's soldier collected the tax. Azim Khan then traveled through Tanwal and then Nawab Khan's soldiers collected taxes through Azim Khan. After Azim Khan felt ashamed and was admitted to the Afghan court then the Afghans Ruler of that time sent their army.

After his son, Painda Khan and Maddad Khan began the series of rebellions against the Sikhs and Durrani which continued throughout his lifetime. To combat Khan, Maharaja Ranjit Singh, sent Hari Singh Nalwa to Hazara as governor, and Singh created several forts at strategic locations to destroy the army of Painda khan but after one by one of Singh fort capture by Painda Khan and hence the rule of Sikh end.

See also
 Tanoli
 Sikh Empire
 Durrani
 Amb (princely state)

References

 </ref><ref>
 
 
 

1792 births
1818 deaths
Sunni Islam
Durrani Empire
Barlas